The following highways are numbered 681:

United States